Adygea may refer to:
Republic of Adygea, a federal subject of Russia
Adyghe Autonomous Oblast (1922–1991), an administrative division of the Russian SFSR, Soviet Union
Adygea Airlines, a defunct state-owned airline in the Republic of Adygea which operated in 1997–2009

See also
Adygeya
Adygeysk